KCOS (channel 13), branded on-air as PBS El Paso, is a PBS member television station in El Paso, Texas, United States, owned by Texas Tech University. The station's studios are located on Viscount Boulevard (northeast of I-10) in northwest El Paso, and its transmitter is located atop the Franklin Mountains on the El Paso city limits.

History

The station first signed on the air on August 18, 1978, originally broadcasting on VHF channel 7. It was the first English-language television station to sign on since KVIA-TV (the original occupant of channel 13 in El Paso) debuted 22 years earlier in September 1956.

Prior to KCOS's debut, El Paso was the largest city in the United States that did not have a PBS member station. Some viewers in the market were able to receive Las Cruces, New Mexico–based KRWG-TV (channel 22). However, the Franklin Mountains significantly impaired KRWG's signal coverage deep into the market, rendering the station unviewable in most of El Paso itself. PBS arranged for NBC affiliate KTSM-TV (channel 9) to carry Sesame Street in the market from the show's 1969 debut until KCOS' sign-on (this was a common practice in other markets throughout the country that similarly lacked access to public television). Until KCOS signed on in 1978, cable providers in the El Paso market piped in KRWG and out-of-market PBS station KNME in Albuquerque.

On July 10, 1981, KCOS switched channel positions with KVIA-TV, the city's ABC affiliate, and moved to VHF channel 13. This was done to give KVIA-TV a greater broadcast signal range on parity with KTSM-TV and CBS affiliate KDBC-TV (channel 4).

On August 12, 2019, a purchase agreement was announced that would see KCOS sold to Texas Tech University for a token amount of $1,000, due to the El Paso Public Television Foundation struggling to fundraise throughout the decade. All local personnel will remain in place under the new ownership, which would see it become a sister station to Lubbock's KTTZ-TV, KTTZ-FM and KTXT-FM. The sale was completed on September 30, 2019.

On November 4, 2019, KCOS rebranded as PBS El Paso to mark its new ownership, as well as align itself with the new brand identity of PBS unveiled that day.

Technical information

Subchannels
The station's digital signal is multiplexed:

Analog-to digital conversion
KCOS shut down its analog signal, over VHF channel 13, at 11:30 p.m. on June 12, 2009, the official date in which full-power television stations in the United States transitioned from analog to digital broadcasts under federal mandate. The station's digital signal relocated from its pre-transition UHF channel 30 to VHF channel 13 for post-transition operations.

External links

References

Texas Tech University
PBS member stations
Television channels and stations established in 1978
COS (TV)
1978 establishments in Texas